Let 'Em Bleed: The Mixxtape, Vol. 1 is a mixtape by DJ Clay. Released in 2008, it is the first installment of a four cd series of mixtapes which contain brand new and remixed songs from artists from the Psychopathic Records and Hatchet House roster.

Track listing

Chart positions

References

2008 mixtape albums
Hatchet House compilation albums